Valeri Ivanovich Burlachenko (born 5 July 1970) is a Russian professional football coach and a former player. He is the manager of the Under-19 squad of FC Nizhny Novgorod.

Club career
He made his professional debut in the Soviet Second League in 1988 for FC Tekstilshchik Kamyshin.

Honours
 Russian Premier League runner-up: 1993, 1997.
 Russian Premier League bronze: 1996.
 Russian Cup finalist: 1995.

European club competitions
With FC Rotor Volgograd.

 UEFA Cup 1994–95: 2 games.
 UEFA Cup 1995–96: 3 games.
 UEFA Intertoto Cup 1996: 5 games.
 UEFA Cup 1997–98: 5 games.

References

1970 births
Sportspeople from Volgograd
Living people
Soviet footballers
Russian footballers
Association football midfielders
Association football defenders
Russian Premier League players
FC Tekstilshchik Kamyshin players
FC Rotor Volgograd players
FC Rubin Kazan players
FC Sokol Saratov players
FC Metallurg Lipetsk players
FC Mordovia Saransk players
Russian football managers
FC Rotor Volgograd managers
FC Sokol Saratov managers